Voyeur is an interactive movie video game released in 1993 for the Philips CD-i. It was ported to MS-DOS compatible operating systems and Macintosh. A major selling point for the game was the "mature" content of the full-motion video sequences, with a number of simulated sex scenes.

A sequel was released for MS-DOS and Macintosh, Voyeur II, and a finished beta version of the sequel for Philips CD-i has been discovered.

Plot
The player takes on the role of a private investigator hired by a member of the wealthy Hawke family in order to gain enough evidence to bring down the corrupt Reed Hawke (played by Robert Culp), CEO of Hawke Industries. Hawke has gathered his family together for the weekend to prepare for his announcement that he will be running for President of the United States. The player controls a video camera located in a building opposite to spy on the Hawke family home in an effort to gather enough evidence to destroy Reed Hawke's career. The player character's client is randomly selected each time a new game is started, and the storyline also changes according to the player's actions.

Development

The design of Voyeur was inspired by the Alfred Hitchcock film Rear Window starring Jimmy Stewart, Grace Kelly, Wendell Corey, Thelma Ritter, and Raymond Burr. In the film, L. B. Jeffries (Stewart) looks into the rear windows of a building across the interior courtyard from his apartment. He is able to see only some of what is going on in the apartments. He has to imagine the rest. He eventually thinks a murder has been committed in one of the apartments. In his effort to get evidence on the murderer, he puts himself and his girlfriend, Lisa Fremont (Kelly), in mortal danger.

This dramatic device was the basis for the design of Voyeur. The player can only see partial scenes playing in the windows of the Reed Hawke mansion at any point in time in the narrative. They must decide what is happening and what they want to do about it based on this partial information. The design also makes use of a ticking clock. Scenes appear in the windows of the Hawke mansion only for a brief period of time. If the player misses any of them or chooses to look at something else, their sense of what is going on could be incomplete. The player has the weekend to stop the nomination of Reed Hawke for president. If they guess wrong about which member of the family is betraying Hawke, the player is killed by Chantal, his personal assistant.

Reception

In 1993 Voyeur Cd-i was featured in Time Magazine  September 27, 1993  Attack of the Video Games. In 1994, Voyeur CD-i won seven Interactive Academy Awards including best director, best design and best actors male and female.

Reviewing the Macintosh version, a Next Generation critic remarked derisively on the limited interactivity of full motion video based games, but said that Voyeur is a superior game by the standards of its genre due to the solid acting. He gave it two out of five stars.

Next Generation reviewed the CD-i version of the game, rating it three stars out of five, and stated that "Although it won't appeal to action fans, this title has enough depth and replay value to be a valuable addition to any CD-i library."

References

External links
 
Voyeur at DefunctGames

1993 video games
CD-i games
Detective video games
DOS games
Erotic video games
Full motion video based games
Interactive movie video games
Classic Mac OS games
ScummVM-supported games
Obscenity controversies in video games
Video games developed in the United States